Maroni may refer to:

 Maroni (river), a river in South America
 Maroni, Cyprus, a village in Cyprus
 Maroni (name), list of people with the name
 Neoepimorius maroni, species of moth
 Papilio maroni, species of butterfly 
 Saint-Laurent-du-Maroni, commune in French Guiana

See also
 Moroni (disambiguation)